Reformation is a 2015 melodramatic neo-noir short film. The film was directed by Hoyon Jung, and stars Ty Trumbo, Ida Nilsen, Kevin Keller and VaLynn Rain.

It held its world premiere on 11 April 2015 at the Tiburon International Film Festival. It has been accepted in various film festivals, including Wizard World Comic Con's Con Film Festival: Philadelphia and Sacramento and San Francisco Frozen Film Festival. The film was released online on January 10, 2015.

Cast
Ty Trumbo as Bryan
Ida Nilsen as Rachel
Kevin Keller as Marcus
VaLynn Rain as Katy
Danny Hansen as Richard
Morgan Galavan as Ice Cream Girl
Beau Berglund as Male Detective
Tasha Danvers as Female Detective
Alexa Blanks as Secretary
Joshua Dawson as Kenny

Accolades
Winner - Best Thriller - Topshorts Online Film Festival 2016 
Winner - Best Screenplay - #TOFF The Online Film Festival 2015 
Winner - Award of Merit Special Mention: Film Short - Best Shorts Competition 2015
Official Selection - Tiburon International Film Festival 2015 
Official Selection - Con Film Festival: Philadelphia 2015/ Wizard World Comic Con Philadelphia
Official Selection - Con Film Festival: Sacramento 2015/ Wizard World Comic Con Sacramento
Official Selection - San Francisco Frozen Film Festival 2015
Official Selection - Eureka Springs Indie Film Festival 2015
Official Selection - Los Angeles CineFest 2015
Official Selection - Village of Brewster Film Festival 2015
Official Selection - #TOFF - The Online Film Festival 2015

Notes
Reformation was shot in HD with Sony α7s. Two shots were taken with Canon 5d Mark III rigged on DJI Ronin.

Locations
Reformation was shot in various locations of Los Angeles County (Los Angeles, Westminster, Anaheim, Culver City, Santa Monica) and the city of San Francisco.

References

External links
 
 

American independent films
American short films
2015 drama films
2015 short films
Films shot in Los Angeles
Films shot in San Francisco
2015 films
2015 independent films
2010s English-language films
2010s American films